Abe McGregor Goff (December 21, 1899  – November 23, 1984) was an attorney and Republican politician from the U.S. state of Idaho, most notably as a one-term congressman from 1947 to 1949. He served in the U.S. Army in both world wars.

Early years
Goff was born and raised in Colfax, Washington, in the Palouse region, the fourth son of Herbert W. and Mary (Dorsey) Goff.  After graduating from high school in 1918, he enlisted in the U.S. Army as a private and underwent preliminary officer training at the University of Idaho in Moscow during the last weeks of World War I. Discharged from the military in December, he entered the law school at the UI in January 1919 and graduated in 1924. He was also the center on the Vandal football team. and was a member of Beta Theta Pi fraternity. His older brothers attended Washington State college in nearby Pullman.

Early career
Goff commenced practice in Moscow the same year and was the prosecuting attorney for Latah County from 1926 to 1934. He also worked as a special lecturer at the UI law school from 1933 to 1941. In 1940, he was made president of the Idaho Bar Association. In 1941, Goff was elected to the Idaho Senate.

World War II
Later the same year, he was activated as a member of the U.S. Army Reserves as a major, and served in the Mediterranean, European, and Pacific theaters. Goff was on General MacArthur's staff at the end of the war and was discharged as a colonel in 1946. While in the military, he was awarded the Legion of Merit.

Congress
In 1946, Goff was elected to Congress as a Republican, narrowly defeating seven-term incumbent Compton White of Clark Fork. He served only one term, as White defeated him in 1948 and reclaimed the seat for a term.

Source:    ^ 1948 election included 93 votes (0.1%) for Socialist Party candidate Richard M. Shaefer.

After Congress
After leaving the House, Goff ran for the U.S. Senate in 1950, but appointed incumbent Henry Dworshak won the nomination in the August primary, then served as Idaho Republican Party Veteran Committee chairman in 1952. Goff then took a number of government posts in Washington, D.C.; he was general counsel of the Post Office Department, and later served on the Interstate Commerce Commission, from 1954 to 1967. After his terms ended, Goff retired to the Palouse in Idaho, working as a writer and lecturer in Moscow until his death in 1984.

Personal life
Goff married Florence Letitia Richardson (1892–1987) of Moscow in 1927. They were married for 57 years and are buried at Moscow Cemetery, east of the city. They had two children: Timothy Richardson Goff (1932–72) and Annie McGregor Goff (b. 1935- 2018).

References

External links

University of Idaho Library – Abe McGregor Goff papers, 1915–1968
University of Idaho Library – Abe Goff interviews – 1974 (audio, 3 hours) 
Political Graveyard – Abe McGregor Goff

1899 births
1984 deaths
People from Colfax, Washington
Republican Party members of the United States House of Representatives from Idaho
Republican Party Idaho state senators
People of the Interstate Commerce Commission
Idaho lawyers
People from Moscow, Idaho
20th-century American politicians
20th-century American lawyers
University of Idaho alumni
University of Idaho College of Law alumni
United States Army colonels
United States Army personnel of World War I
United States Army personnel of World War II
Recipients of the Legion of Merit